Joseph Allston Newhall (May 29, 1847 – March 15, 1907) was an American businessman and politician.

Early life
Newhall was born on May 29, 1847, in Saugus, Massachusetts to J. Stocker and Emeline A. (Ware) Newhall. He attended Saugus Public Schools and the Chauncy Hall School in Boston. In 1873 he married Amelia B. Westermann.

Politics
Newhall was a member of the Saugus board of selectmen from 1878 to 1880. In 1880 he represented the 13th Essex district in the Massachusetts House of Representatives.

Military
Newhall served in the First Corps of Cadets from 1878 to 1882. From June 16, 1887, to December 23, 1890, he was a first lieutenant in the First Battalion of the Ancient and Honorable Artillery Company of Massachusetts.

Business career
Newhall engaged in Morocco leather manufacturing. He also served as president of the Commonwealth Mutual Fire Insurance Company, which was formed in 1894 to provide mercantile insurance throughout the United States. The company went into receivership the following year. The J. Alston Newhall Company was dissolved in 1904 and Newhall died on March 15, 1907, in Saugus.

References

1847 births
1907 deaths
Members of the Massachusetts House of Representatives
Leather manufacturers
People from Saugus, Massachusetts